Kalisia was a French progressive metal band founded in 1994.

In 2009 the band released their first full-length album, Cybion, originally planned for 2003, mainly consisting of a one-hour song. It features guest appearances by Angela Gossow, Paul Masvidal and Arjen Anthony Lucassen.

Although never officially disbanded, Kalisia has been inactive since 2012, with no public announcements, performances or releases made since.

Band members 

Current members
 Brett Caldas-Lima - lead vocals, guitars, programming (1994–present)
 Thibaut Gerard - bass (1994–present)
 Laurent Pouget - keyboards (1994–present)
 Bruno Michel - guitars (2004–present)
 Élodie Bouchonnet - lead vocals, flute, saxophone (2005–present)
 Anthony Druz - drums (2010–present)

Former members
 Loïc Tézénas - guitars (1994–2004)
 Laurent Bendahan - drums (1994–2004)

Discography 
 Whisper (demo, 1994)
 Skies (demo, 1995)
 Cybion (2009)

References

French progressive metal musical groups
French death metal musical groups
Musical groups established in 1994
1994 establishments in France